Jimani Airport  was an airstrip serving Jimani, Independencia, Dominican Republic.

Google Earth Historical Imagery (2/11/2002) shows an  sand runway paralleling Highway 46 near the southeastern shore of Lake Azuéi. The (1/12/2010) image shows the lake had risen and inundated the runway. Current (10/24/2016) imagery shows the lake has risen further and the runway is completely under water.

See also

Transport in the Dominican Republic
List of airports in the Dominican Republic

References

External links
OurAirports - Jimani Airport
OpenStreetMap - Jimani

Defunct airports
Airports in the Dominican Republic
Buildings and structures in Independencia Province